XI Riigikogu was the eleventh legislature of the Estonian Parliament (Riigikogu). The legislature was elected after 2007 election.

Election results

Officers
Speaker of the Riigikogu: Ene Ergma.

List of members of the Riigikogu

References

Riigikogu